Stefania Buttignon (born 7 July 1997) is an Italian female rower, bronze medal winner at senior level at the European Rowing Championships.

References

External links
 

1997 births
Living people
Italian female rowers